Nello Velucchi (born 9 February 1936) is an Italian racing cyclist. He rode in the 1962 Tour de France.

References

External links
 

1936 births
Living people
Italian male cyclists
Place of birth missing (living people)
Sportspeople from the Province of Arezzo
Cyclists from Tuscany